Arthur Basil Radford (25 June 189720 October 1952) was an English character actor who featured in many British films of the 1930s and 1940s.

He trained at the Royal Academy of Dramatic Art and made his first stage appearance in July 1924. He is probably best remembered for his appearances alongside Naunton Wayne as two cricket-obsessed Englishmen in several films from 1938 to 1949.

Early life
Radford was born in Chester, England, on 25 June 1897.

First World War
He was a commissioned officer in the British South Staffordshire Regiment in the First World War, in 1918 transferring into the Royal Air Force, ending the war as a subaltern when he was demobilised in 1920. Radford had a crescent-shaped scar on his right cheek from a wound sustained during his time in the trenches. Depending on the lighting and camera angle it varied from barely perceptible to prominent.

Film career
Radford first appeared with Naunton Wayne as their characters Charters and Caldicott in Alfred Hitchcock's 1938 thriller The Lady Vanishes. They were popular enough to reprise their roles in Night Train to Munich, which was again scripted by Frank Launder and Sidney Gilliat.

They appeared together in several other 1940s films, including Crook's Tour (1941), The Next of Kin (1942), Millions Like Us (1943), Dead of Night (1945), Quartet (1948), It's Not Cricket (1949), Stop Press Girl (1949), and Passport to Pimlico (1949).

Apart from his long-running partnership with Naunton Wayne, Radford made many other memorable film appearances in character roles. His other films included Young and Innocent (also for Hitchcock) (1937), The Way to the Stars (1945), The Captive Heart (1946), The Winslow Boy (1948) and Whisky Galore! (1949).

Personal life
In 1926, he married Shirley Deuchars. They had one son.

Death
Radford's health began seriously to fail in the summer of 1951, forcing him to take a long break from acting. He died at St George's Hospital, Westminster, London, on 20 October 1952, from liver failure due to cirrhosis of the liver.

Complete filmography

* Charters and Caldicott films

Selected stage appearances
 Night Must Fall by Emlyn Williams (1935)
 Someone at the Door by Campbell Christie (1935)
 Blondie White by Bernard Merivale and Jeffrey Dell (1937)
 The Innocent Party by H.M. Harwood (1938)
 Warn That Man! by Vernon Sylvaine (1941)
 The Blind Goddess by Patrick Hastings (1947)
 A Penny for a Song by John Whiting (1951)

References

External links
 

1897 births
1952 deaths
English male film actors
People from Chester
20th-century English male actors
Alumni of RADA
British male comedy actors
British Army personnel of World War I
South Staffordshire Regiment officers
Royal Air Force personnel of World War I
Royal Air Force officers
Deaths from cirrhosis
Military personnel from Chester